Shalon Knight (born 4 March 2000) is an Antigua and Barbudan international footballer who plays for the Antigua and Barbuda national football team.

Career statistics

International

References

External links
 
 Shalon Knight at Caribbean Football Database
 2018 statistics at DakStats

2000 births
Living people
Antigua and Barbuda footballers
Antigua and Barbuda international footballers
Antigua and Barbuda youth international footballers
Association football forwards
William Penn Statesmen men's soccer players
People from St. John's, Antigua and Barbuda